NGC 4564 is an elliptical galaxy located about 57 million light-years away in the constellation Virgo. NGC 4564 was discovered by astronomer William Herschel on March 15, 1784. The galaxy is also a member of the Virgo Cluster.

NGC 4564 has an estimated population of 213 ± 31 globular clusters. It is the host of a supermassive black hole with an estimated mass of about 56 million suns.

On May 2, 1961, a Type Ia supernova designated as SN 1961H was discovered in NGC 4564.

See also
 NGC 3115
 NGC 5102

References

External links

Virgo (constellation)
Elliptical galaxies
4564
042051
07773
Astronomical objects discovered in 1784
Virgo Cluster
Discoveries by William Herschel